Peanut allergy is a type of food allergy to peanuts. It is different from tree nut allergies, because peanuts are legumes and not true nuts. Physical symptoms of allergic reaction can include itchiness, hives, swelling, eczema, sneezing, asthma attack, abdominal pain, drop in blood pressure, diarrhea, and cardiac arrest. Anaphylaxis may occur. Those with a history of asthma are more likely to be severely affected.

It is due to a type I hypersensitivity reaction of the immune system in susceptible individuals. The allergy is recognized "as one of the most severe food allergies due to its prevalence, persistency, and potential severity of allergic reaction."

Prevention may be partly achieved through early introduction of peanuts to the diets of pregnant women and babies. It is recommended that babies at high risk be given peanut products in areas where medical care is available as early as 4 months of age. The principal treatment for anaphylaxis is the injection of epinephrine.

In the United States, peanut allergy is present in 0.6% of the population. Among children in the Western world, rates are between 1.5% and 3% and have increased over time. It is a common cause of food-related fatal and near-fatal allergic reactions.

Signs and symptoms

Most symptoms of peanut allergy are related to the action of immunoglobulin E (IgE) and other anaphylatoxins which act to release histamine and other mediator substances from mast cells (degranulation). In addition to other effects, histamine induces vasodilation of arterioles and constriction of bronchioles in the lungs, also known as bronchospasm. Symptoms can also include mild itchiness, hives, angioedema, facial swelling, rhinitis, vomiting, diarrhea, acute abdominal pain, exacerbation of atopic eczema, asthma, and cardiac arrest. Anaphylaxis may occur.

Cross-reactivity with other food allergies
People with confirmed peanut allergy may have cross-reactivity to tree nut, soy, and other legumes, such as peas and lentils and lupinus. The cause of cross-reactivity results from similarity in the  structures of storage proteins between the food sources. Allergenic proteins are grouped by protein families: cupins, prolamins, profilin and others. Peanuts and soybeans have proteins in the cupin, prolamin, and profilin families, while lentils contain cupin proteins. Reviews of human clinical trials report that 6–40% of people with a confirmed peanut allergy will have allergic symptoms when challenged with tree nuts or legumes.

Causes
Oral consumption is the most common route of exposure, but topical (skin) and inhalation can also trigger allergic reactions. There are at least 11 peanut proteins identified as allergenic. The condition is associated with several specific proteins categorized according to four common food allergy superfamilies: Cupin (Ara h 1), Prolamin (Ara h 2, 6, 7, 9), Profilin (Ara h 5), and Bet v-1-related proteins (Ara h 8). Among these peanut allergens, Ara h 1, Ara h 2, Ara h 3 and Ara h 6 are considered to be major allergens which means that they trigger an immunological response in more than 50% of the allergic population. These peanut allergens mediate an immune response via release of Immunoglobulin E (IgE) antibody as part of the allergic reaction.

Some of the peanut allergens can undergo enzymatic and non-enzymatic modifications which makes them more likely to bind to ligands on antigen-presenting cells. Ara h 1 can undergo glycosylation modifications which have been shown to induce immunomodulatory responses; it stimulates lectin receptors MR and DC-SIGN on dendritic cells which further propagate cytokines and bias the immune system towards a Th2 type response. Peanut proteins that undergo non-enzymatic changes through Maillard reactions when cooked or exposed to room temperature have an increase in AGE modifications on their structure. These changes have been shown to stimulate RAGE receptors and SR-AI/II on dendritic cells and thus lead to an increase in IL-4 and IL-5-releasing Th2 cells.

Peanut allergies are uncommon in children of undeveloped countries where peanut products have been used to relieve malnutrition. The hygiene hypothesis proposes that the relatively low incidence of childhood peanut allergies in undeveloped countries is a result of exposure to peanuts early in life, increasing immune capability. A possibility of cross-reaction to soy was dismissed by an analysis finding no linkage to consumption of soy protein, and indicated that appearance of any linkage is likely due to preference to using soy milk among families with known milk allergies.

Desensitization through exposure
In infants with a family history of peanut allergy, consuming peanut proteins at 4 to 11 months old has been shown to reduce the risk of developing an allergic response by 11–25%. From these results, the American Academy of Pediatrics rescinded their recommendation to delay exposure to peanuts in children, also stating there is no reason to avoid peanuts during pregnancy or breastfeeding.  A later study by the National Institutes of Health provided further evidence supporting this.  The study involved giving children diagnosed as "high allergic" small portions of peanut flour daily for several years, with some children randomly assigned placebo flour.  The results were 71% of the children receiving peanut flour became desensitized to peanuts, while 2% receiving placebo flour became desensitized.

Diet during pregnancy
There is conflicting evidence on whether maternal diet during pregnancy has any effect on development of allergies due to a lack of good studies. A 2010 systematic review of clinical research indicated that there is insufficient evidence for whether maternal peanut exposure, or early consumption of peanuts by children, affects sensitivity for peanut allergy.

Routes of exposure

While the most obvious route for an allergic exposure is unintentional ingestion, some reactions are possible through external exposure. Peanut allergies are much more common in adults who had oozing and crusted skin rashes as infants. Sensitive children may react via ingestion, inhalation, or skin contact to peanut allergens which have persistence in the environment, possibly lasting over months.

Airborne particles in a farm- or factory-scale shelling or crushing environment, or from cooking, can produce respiratory effects in exposed allergic individuals. Empirical testing has discredited some reports of this type and shown some to be exaggerated. Residue on surfaces has been known to cause minor skin rashes, though not anaphylaxis. In The Peanut Allergy Answer Book, Harvard pediatrician Michael Young characterized this secondary contact risk to allergic individuals as rare and limited to minor symptoms. Some reactions have been noted to be psychosomatic in nature, the result of conditioning, and belief rather than a true chemical reaction. Blinded, placebo-controlled studies were unable to produce any reactions using the odor of peanut butter or its mere proximity.

Rarely, allergic reactions have been triggered by exposure from kissing and sexual contact, especially if the partner has eaten peanuts within the last hour.  In 2005, a "kiss of death" was misreported as being due to peanut allergy; instead, the person died of an asthma attack after smoking.

Pathophysiology
The allergy arises due to dendritic cells recognizing peanut allergens as foreign pathogens. They present the antigens on MHC class II receptors and these antigens are recognized by cell receptors on T cells. The contact along with the release of the cytokine IL-4 induces their differentiation into CD4+ Th2 cells. The Th2 cells proliferate and release pro-inflammatory cytokines, such as IL-4, IL-5, and IL-13, which can be bound to receptors on undifferentiated B cells or B cells of the IgM subtype. The receptor-cytokine binding causes their differentiation into IgE which can then be bound onto FcεRI on mast cells, eosinophils and basophils. This elicits degranulation of the aforementioned cells which release potent cytokines and chemokines, thus triggering inflammation and causing the symptoms characteristic of allergy.

Diagnosis
Diagnosis of food allergies, including peanut allergy, begins with a medical history and physical examination. National Institute of Allergy and Infectious Diseases (NIAID) guidelines recommend that parent and patient reports of food allergy be confirmed by a doctor because "multiple studies demonstrate 50% to 90% of presumed food allergies are not allergies."

Skin prick testing
Skin prick tests can be used to confirm specific food allergies. Skin prick tests are designed to identify specific IgE bound to cutaneous mast cells. During the test, a glycerinated allergen extract drop is placed on the patient's skin. The patient's skin is then pricked through the drop. This procedure is repeated with two controls: a histamine drop designed to elicit an allergic response, and a saline drop designed to elicit no allergic response. The wheal that develops from the glycerinated extract drop is compared against the saline control. A positive allergic test is one in which the extract wheal is 3mm larger than the saline wheal. A positive skin prick test is about 50% accurate, so a positive skin prick test alone is not diagnostic of food allergies.

Oral food challenge
The "gold standard" of diagnostic tests is a double-blind placebo-controlled oral food challenge. At least two weeks prior to an oral food challenge, the person is placed on an elimination diet where the suspected allergen is avoided. During the oral food challenge, they are administered a full age-appropriate serving of a suspected allergen in escalating size increments. They are continuously monitored for allergic reaction during the test, and the challenge is stopped and treatment administered at the first objective sign of allergic reaction.

Oral food challenges pose risks. In a study of 584 oral food challenges administered to 382 patients, 48% (253) of challenges resulted in allergic reactions. 28% (72) of these challenges resulted in "severe" reactions, which were defined by the study as a patient having: lower respiratory symptoms; cardiovascular symptoms; or any four other, more minor, symptoms. Double-blind placebo-controlled oral food challenges are also time-consuming and require close medical supervision. Because of these drawbacks to the double-blind placebo-controlled oral food challenge, open food challenges are the most commonly used form of food challenge. Open food challenges are those in which a patient is fed an age-appropriate serving of a suspected food allergen in its natural form. The observation of objective symptoms resulting from ingestion of the food, such as vomiting or wheezing, is considered diagnostic of food allergy if the symptoms correlate with findings from the patient's medical history and laboratory testing such as the skin prick test.

Prevention
In 2017, the US National Institute of Allergy and Infectious Diseases  published revised guidelines for lowering the risk or preventing peanut allergies by creating separate ways to assess childhood allergies and guide parents with infants at high, moderate or low risk. The guidelines discussed how to introduce peanut foods to infants as early as 4 to 6 months of age, with the goal of preventing peanut allergy.

For high-risk children, the guide recommended that an allergy specialist assess a child's susceptibility, possibly involving peanut allergy testing, followed by gradual introduction of peanut foods under the supervision of an allergy specialist. Peanut allergy is confirmed only if there is a history of reactions to peanut consumption and by a positive allergy test. Moderate-risk children – who display an allergic reaction to peanut products with mild to moderate eczema – are typically not assessed in a clinic, but rather have peanut foods gradually provided to them at home by their parents, beginning at around age 6 months. The Learning Early About Peanut Allergy (LEAP) study supported by NIAID established that early introduction of peanut products into a child's diet can prevent – rather than only delay – the development of childhood peanut allergies, and that the effect is beneficial and lifelong.

Treatment

Treatment for accidental ingestion of peanut products by allergic individuals varies depending on the sensitivity of the person. An antihistamine such as diphenhydramine may be prescribed. Sometimes prednisone will be prescribed to prevent a possible late phase Type I hypersensitivity reaction. Severe allergic reactions (anaphalaxis) may require treatment with an epinephrine pen, which is an injection device designed to be used by a non-healthcare professional when emergency treatment is warranted.

As of 2021, there is no cure for peanut allergy other than strict avoidance of peanuts and peanut-containing foods. Extra care is needed for food consumed at or purchased from restaurants.

Immunotherapy
Immunotherapy involves attempts to reduce allergic sensitivity by repeated exposure to small amounts of peanut products. Evidence as of 2019, however, has found that it increases rather than decreases the risk of serious allergies. None of these are considered ready for use in people outside of carefully conducted trials. A 2012 Cochrane Review concluded that more research was needed. Sublingual immunotherapy involves putting gradually increasing doses of an allergy extract under a person's tongue. The extract is then either spat or swallowed. As of 2014, the evidence did not show that this was safe or effective. Epicutaneous immunotherapy involves giving the allergen through a patch and has also been researched.

In September 2014, the U.S. Food and Drug Administration (FDA) granted fast track designation, and in June 2015, granted breakthrough therapy designation to AR101 for peanut allergy in ages 4–17. AR101 was studied in the PALISADE international, multicenter, randomized, double-blind, placebo-controlled study.

In September 2019, the Allergenic Products Advisory Committee (APAC) of the Center for Biologics Evaluation and Research (CBER) voted to support the use of peanut allergen powder (Palforzia) for peanut allergy.

In January 2020, peanut allergen powder was approved in the United States to mitigate allergic reactions, including anaphylaxis, that may occur with accidental exposure to peanuts. Treatment with peanut allergen powder may be initiated in individuals ages four through 17 years with a confirmed diagnosis of peanut allergy and may be continued in individuals four years of age and older. Those who take peanut allergen powder must continue to avoid peanuts in their diets.

On 15 October 2020, the European Medicines Agency (EMA) issued a favourable opinion for Palforzia. This medicine will be available as an oral powder in capsules (0.5, 1, 10, 20 and 100 mg) and as an oral powder in sachets (300 mg).

Prognosis 
Peanut allergies tend to resolve in childhood less often than allergies to soy, milk, egg, and wheat. Accordingly, re-evaluation of peanut allergy is recommended on a yearly basis for young children with favorable previous test results, and every few years or longer for older children and adults. A 2001 study showed that peanut allergy is outgrown in 22% of cases for people aged 4 to 20 years.

Epidemiology
The percentage of people with peanut allergies is 0.6% in the United States. In a 2008 study, self-reported incidence of peanut allergy was estimated to affect 1.4% of children the United States, triple the 0.4% rate found in a 1997 study. In England, an estimated 4,000 people are newly diagnosed with peanut allergy every year, 25,700 having been diagnosed with peanut allergy at some point in their lives.

Peanut allergy is one of the most dangerous food allergies, and one of the least likely to be outgrown. In Western countries, the incidence of peanut allergy is between 1.5% and 3%. There has been a sudden increase in number of cases in the early 21st century.

It is one of the most common causes of food-related deaths. A meta-analysis found that death due to overall food-induced anaphylaxis was 1.8 per million person-years in people having food allergies, with peanut as the most common allergen. However, there are opinions that the measures taken in response to the threat may be an over-reaction out of proportion to the level of danger. Media sensationalism has been blamed for anxiety outweighing reality.

Frequency among adults and children is similar—around 1%—but one study showed self-reports of peanut allergy are on the rise in children in the United States. The number of young children self-reporting the allergy doubled between 1997 and 2002. Studies have found that self-reported rates of food allergies is higher than clinically observed rates of food allergies. The rates in self-reported incidence of the allergy, previously thought to be rare, may not be correlated with medical data confirming the self-reported incidence.

Society and culture
The high severity of peanut allergy reactions, as well as the increasing prevalence of peanut allergy in the Western world have led to widespread public attention. However, the perceived prevalence of food allergies in the public view is substantially higher than the actual prevalence of food allergies. Because peanut allergy awareness has increased, there are impacts on the quality of life for children, their parents and their immediate caregivers. In the United States, the Food Allergen Labeling and Consumer Protection Act of 2004 causes people to be reminded of allergy problems every time they handle a food package, and restaurants have added allergen warnings to menus. The Culinary Institute of America, a premier school for chef training, has courses in allergen-free cooking and a separate teaching kitchen. School systems have protocols about what foods can be brought into the school. Despite all these precautions, people with serious allergies are aware that accidental exposure can still easily occur at other people's houses, at school or in restaurants. Food fear has a significant impact on quality of life. Finally, for children with allergies, their quality of life is also affected by actions of their peers. There is an increased occurrence of bullying, which can include threats or acts of deliberately being touched with foods they need to avoid or having their allergen-free food deliberately contaminated.

Labeling

In response to the risk that certain foods pose to those with food allergies, some countries have responded by instituting labeling laws that require food products to clearly inform consumers if their products contain major allergens or byproducts of major allergens among the ingredients intentionally added to foods. Nevertheless, there are no labeling laws to mandatory declare the presence of trace amounts in the final product as a consequence of cross-contamination, except in Brazil.

Ingredients intentionally added
In the United States, the Food Allergen Labeling and Consumer Protection Act of 2004 (FALCPA), which became effective January 1, 2006, requires companies to disclose on the label whether a packaged food product contains any of these eight major food allergens, added intentionally: cow's milk, peanuts, eggs, shellfish, fish, tree nuts, soy and wheat. This list originated in 1999, from the World Health Organisation Codex Alimentarius Commission. To meet FALCPA labeling requirements, if an ingredient is derived from one of the required-label allergens, then it must either have its "food sourced name" in parentheses, for example "Casein (milk)," or as an alternative, there must be a statement separate but adjacent to the ingredients list: "Contains milk" (and any other of the allergens with mandatory labeling). The European Union requires listing for those eight major allergens plus molluscs, celery, mustard, lupin, sesame and sulfites.

FALCPA applies to packaged foods regulated by the US Food and Drug Administration (FDA), which does not include poultry, most meats, certain egg products, and most alcoholic beverages. However, some meat, poultry, and egg processed products may contain allergenic ingredients. These products are regulated by the Food Safety and Inspection Service (FSIS), which requires that any ingredient be declared in the labeling only by its common or usual name. Neither the identification of the source of a specific ingredient in a parenthetical statement nor the use of statements to alert for the presence of specific ingredients, like "Contains: milk", are mandatory according to FSIS.  FALCPA also does not apply to food prepared in restaurants. The EU Food Information for Consumers Regulation 1169/2011 – requires food businesses to provide allergy information on food sold unpackaged, for example, in catering outlets, deli counters, bakeries and sandwich bars.

In the United States, there is no federal mandate to address the presence of allergens in drug products. FALCPA does not apply to medicines nor to cosmetics.

Trace amounts as a result of cross-contamination
The value of allergen labeling other than for intentional ingredients is controversial. This concerns labeling for ingredients present unintentionally as a consequence of cross-contact or cross-contamination at any point along the food chain (during raw material transportation, storage or handling, due to shared equipment for processing and packaging, etc.). Experts in this field propose that if allergen labeling is to be useful to consumers, and healthcare professionals who advise and treat those consumers, ideally there should be agreement on which foods require labeling, threshold quantities below which labeling may be of no purpose, and validation of allergen detection methods to test and potentially recall foods that were deliberately or inadvertently contaminated.

Labeling regulations have been modified to provide for mandatory labeling of ingredients plus voluntary labeling, termed precautionary allergen labeling (PAL), also known as "may contain" statements, for possible, inadvertent, trace amount, cross-contamination during production. PAL labeling can be confusing to consumers, especially as there can be many variations on the wording of the warning.  PAL is regulated only in Switzerland, Japan, Argentina, and South Africa. Argentina decided to prohibit precautionary allergen labeling since 2010, and instead puts the onus on the manufacturer to control the manufacturing process and label only those allergenic ingredients known to be in the products. South Africa does not permit the use of PAL, except when manufacturers demonstrate the potential presence of allergen due to cross-contamination through a documented risk assessment and despite adherence to Good Manufacturing Practice. In Australia and New Zealand there is a recommendation that PAL be replaced by guidance from VITAL 2.0 (Vital Incidental Trace Allergen Labeling). A review identified "the eliciting dose for an allergic reaction in 1% of the population" as ED01. This threshold reference dose for foods (such as cow's milk, egg, peanut and other proteins) will provide food manufacturers with guidance for developing precautionary labeling and give consumers a better idea of might be accidentally in a food product beyond "may contain." VITAL 2.0 was developed by the Allergen Bureau, a food industry sponsored, non-government organization. The European Union has initiated a process to create labeling regulations for unintentional contamination but is not expected to publish such before 2024.

In Brazil, since April 2016, the declaration of the possibility of cross-contamination is mandatory when the product does not intentionally add any allergenic food or its derivatives, but the Good Manufacturing Practices and allergen control measures adopted are not sufficient to prevent the presence of accidental trace amounts. These allergens include wheat, rye, barley, oats and their hybrids, crustaceans, eggs, fish, peanuts, soybean, milk of all species of mammalians, almonds, hazelnuts, cashew nuts, Brazil nuts, macadamia nuts, walnuts, pecan nuts, pistaches, pine nuts, and chestnuts.

See also

 Allergy (has diagrams showing involvement of different types of white blood cells)
 Food allergy (has images of hives, skin prick test and patch test)
 List of allergens (food and non-food)
 Tree nut allergy (can be cross-reactive to peanut allergy)

References

Further reading
 </ref>

External links
 

Allergy, peanuts
Food allergies